Heladio Elías Ramírez López (born 11 May 1939) is a Mexican politician affiliated with the PRI. As of 2014 he served as Senator of the LX and LXI Legislatures of the Mexican Congress representing the Federal District. He also served as Deputy during the 1976–79 period, and the Governor of Oaxaca from 1986 to 1992.

He was the President of the Chamber of Deputies in 1976.

References

1939 births
Living people
Politicians from Oaxaca
Members of the Senate of the Republic (Mexico)
Members of the Chamber of Deputies (Mexico)
Presidents of the Chamber of Deputies (Mexico)
Presidents of the Senate of the Republic (Mexico)
Institutional Revolutionary Party politicians
21st-century Mexican politicians
20th-century Mexican politicians
National Autonomous University of Mexico alumni
Governors of Oaxaca
People from Huajuapan de León